Anqa, also spelled  'Anqa' , or Anka, or Anqa Mughrib or Anqa al-Mughrib is a large mysterious or fabulous female bird in Arabian mythology. She is said to fly far away and only appear once in ages. However, it is also said that she can be found at "the place of the setting of the sun".

Etymology and notes
The word ʿanqāʾ is the feminine form of ʾaʿnaq meaning "long-necked" and also "long and thick in the neck". This probably implies that the bird resembles a heron or crane (or other long-necked birds) or simply has a large strong neck like an eagle or falcon (or other raptors) with which she was identified by some. The word muḡrib has a number of meanings signifying "strange, foreign", "distant, remote", "west, sunset", "desolated, unknown" and "white, dawn" and expresses the enigma as well as unreality associated with the creature.  

ʿAnqāʾ, however, is also related to ʿanāq ( "misfortune, hard affair") and was, along with ʿanqāʾ muḡrib used to mean a calamity. It was so because the bird  was said to be originally created with all perfections but became a plague or scourge and was killed.

Characteristics
The anqa was described as "very beautiful and colorful with a long neck, human face, four pairs of wings, and some resemblance with every living being" and a "whiteness" in its neck. Zakariya al-Qazwini in this cosmological book The Wonders of Creation comments about the anqa as "the kin of birds that lived alone on Mount Qaf" and "a wise bird with experience gained throughout many ages and gives admonitions and moral advice". Qazwini also says that the bird lives for 1700 years, mating at 500 years of age and that the chick, after the egg breaks, stays inside and only comes out after 125 years.

It is said that Anqa eats nothing except elephants and large fish.

Identification
The anqa is frequently identified (to the point of becoming synonymous) with the simurgh of Persian mythology along with the Armenian and Byzantine eagles and the Turkic Konrul, also called semrük, probably due to the sphere of influence of the Persian Empire. It is also almost always glossed as a phoenix. In Turkish, the other name for the Konrul as well as a phoenix is  "the emerald anqa". In modern arabic Anqa is identified as a phoenix or griffin.

See also
 Simurgh
 Phoenix
 Chalkydri, bird hybrid creatures that live near the Sun alongside phoenixes from the Second book of Enoch
 Roc, another enormous legendary bird of Middle Eastern origin popularized in Arab folklore 
 Anzû, a massive bird divinity or monster in Mesopotamian religion
 Konrul, also known as Zumrud Anka

Bibliography
 Wafayat al-aʼyan by Ibn Khallikan biography number 349
 Lisān al-ʿArab by Ibn Manzur part 10 page 276
 The Wonder of Creation by Zakariya al-Qazwini
 Kitab al-'Ayn by Al-Khalil ibn Ahmad al-Farahidi

Notes

References

Arabian legendary creatures
Demons
Female legendary creatures
Griffins
Legendary birds
Phoenix birds